Tommy Bauro (born 15 August 1965) is a former boxer who competed for the Solomon Islands.

Bauro competed in the 1988 Summer Olympics entering the light-heavyweight, he was knocked out after 2 minutes and 20 seconds by Tongan, Sione Vaveni Taliaʻuli.

References

External links
 

1965 births
Living people
Light-heavyweight boxers
Solomon Islands male boxers
Olympic boxers of the Solomon Islands
Boxers at the 1988 Summer Olympics